In and Out is a Canadian animated short film, directed by Alison Snowden and David Fine and released in 1989.

Summary
The film tells the story of a man's life from birth to old age.

Accolades
The film received a Genie Award nomination for Best Animated Short Film at the 11th Genie Awards in 1990.

See also
George and Rosemary
Bob's Birthday

References

External links
 

1989 films
Canadian animated short films
Films directed by Alison Snowden and David Fine
1989 animated films
1980s animated short films
Films about death
Animated films without speech
1980s English-language films
1980s Canadian films